Alexandra Gennadiyevna Touretski (born 20 September 1994) is a Swiss freestyle swimmer. She competed in the women's 4 × 100 metre freestyle relay event at the 2016 Summer Olympics.

Touretski is the daughter of the Russian-born swimming coach Gennadi Touretski. She was born in Australia, where her father worked at the time, and around 2004 moved to Switzerland with her family. She speaks Russian, English and German.

References

External links
 

1994 births
Living people
Swiss female freestyle swimmers
Swiss people of Russian descent
Olympic swimmers of Switzerland
Swimmers at the 2016 Summer Olympics
Sportspeople from Canberra
20th-century Swiss women
21st-century Swiss women